Halestorm is the debut studio album by American rock band Halestorm. It was released in 2009 by Atlantic Records. The record was produced by Howard Benson and includes a collaboration with Evanescence's former member Ben Moody as a co-writer in the track "Innocence". Halestorm received generally mixed reviews from music critics. Commercially, the album was a modest success, debuting at number 40 on the US Billboard 200. The first single from the album, "I Get Off" received considerable play time and peaked at 17 on the Billboard Hot Rock & Alternative Songs chart. The 10th Anniversary Edition was released on December 20, 2019.

10th Anniversary Edition 
The band celebrated the tenth anniversary of the album's release by releasing a 10th Anniversary Edition featuring "all-new artwork as well as pre-production demos and bonus material."

In a statement announcing the reissue of Halestorm, Lzzy Hale said: "We lived through a fire, a mudslide, an earthquake and 19 months in Burbank, California to make sure our debut album was released. To celebrate our 10th year anniversary of our debut album on Atlantic Records, we decided to include raw, never-before-heard demos and rejects, new art, and personal letter from me taking you through our roller-coaster ride. I hope you enjoy this special piece of Halestorm history."

Track listing
All tracks are produced by Howard Benson.

Personnel
Credits adapted from the liner notes of Halestorm.

Band members
 Lzzy Hale − vocals, guitar, keyboard
 Arejay Hale − drums, percussion, backing vocals
 Joe Hottinger − guitar, backing vocals
 Josh Smith − bass guitar, backing vocals

Additional musicians
 Phil X − guitar 
 Howard Benson − keyboards, Hammond organ
 Debbie Lurie − strings arrangement

Technical

 Mark Vangool – guitar technician
 Jon Nicholson – drum technician
 Paul Decardi – digital editing
 Mike Plotnikoff − recording
 Ashburn Miller − strings recording 
 Hatsukazu Inagaki − additional engineering
 Howard Benson − production
 Chris Lord-Alge − mixing
 Howard Benson − programming
 Ted Jensen − mastering

Managerial and artwork

 Bill McGathy − management
 Vincent Hartong − management
 Scott Sokol − booking
 John Bongiorno − booking
 Nick Ferrara − legal representation
 Beth Sabbagh − business management
 Carla Karakesisoglu − business management
 Diana de la Cerda − business management
 Pete Ganbarg − artists and repertoire
 Leigh Lust − artists and repertoire
 Anne DeClemente − artists and repertoire administration
 Phil Mucci − photography
 Mark Stutzman − cover illustration
 Brian Ranney − packaging production

Charts

Certifications

Notes

References

2009 debut albums
Halestorm albums
Atlantic Records albums
Albums produced by Howard Benson